Leslie-Burl McLemore (born August 17, 1940) is an American civil rights activist and political leader from Jackson, Mississippi. He served as interim mayor of Jackson following the death of Frank Melton on May 7, 2009 until the inauguration of re-elected mayor Harvey Johnson, Jr. on July 3, 2009.

Biography
Leslie-Burl McLemore was born in Walls, Mississippi on August 17, 1940, the son of sharecroppers.

In September 1960, McLemore began studies at Rust College. It was there that he first became seriously involved in the Civil Rights Movement. Within a month, McLemore participated in a boycott of a theatre in Holly Springs because they would not allow blacks to sit in the downstairs section.

While at Rust College, McLemore would continue to be involved in student protests.  He also became involved with the National Association for the Advancement of Colored People (NAACP) and Student Nonviolent Coordinating Committee (SNCC) in various activities including voter registration drives. McLemore served as northern regional coordinator for the 1963 Freedom Ballot campaign.

In 1964, McLemore was intimately involved in the formation of the Mississippi Freedom Democratic Party (MFDP). He was a founding member of the MFDP Executive Committee, an MFDP delegate to the 1964 Democratic National Convention, and Vice Chair of the Party. Previous to the convention, he worked alongside Ella Baker, Frank Smith, Elenore Homes Norton, and Charlies Sherrod as coordinator and lobbyist of the National Office of the MFDP in Washington DC.

McLemore graduated from Rust College in 1964 with a bachelor's degree in social science and economics.  He is a founding president of Rust College's chapter of the NAACP.  He pursued graduate studies at Atlanta University, where he obtained a master's degree in political science. 
 
Later, McLemore received a doctorate in government from the University of Massachusetts Amherst. At the University of Massachusetts, Amherst, McLemore helped to found the W.E.B. DuBois Department of African American Studies.  He later had post-doctoral fellowships at The Johns Hopkins University and at Harvard University. He then took a position teaching at Jackson State University as the founding Chair of the Department of Political Science, and then Dean of the Graduate School and Founding Director of the Office of Research. McLemore concluded his service at Jackson State as the Interim President of the intuition. He has published in the areas of black politics, southern politics, environmental politics, and the Civil Rights Movement. He is the co-author of, Freedom Summer: A Brief History with Documents.

In 1997, McLemore become the founding Director of the Fannie Lou Hamer National Institute on Citizenship and Democracy. Over the course of more than twenty years, the Hamer Institute conducted numerous summer institutes for K-12 students, K-12 teachers, and Community College and University faculty.

Burl-McLemore is married to his wife, Attorney Betty Mallett.  They have one child, a son, Leslie II, who is a practicing attorney and writer in Washington DC and is married to Jacinta, a federal employee. They have two children, Harper Anniece-Diane and Harlow-Leslie.

Until his retirement, McLemore served on the Jackson City Council, representing the second ward and serving as council president.  Upon the death of Mayor Frank Melton, McLemore also served as acting mayor. McLemore did not seek re-election to his council seat.  His term ended in July 2009.

While teaching at Jackson State University, McLemore returned to Walls where he is currently serving as a member of the Walls Board of Aldermen. Upon election in 2017, he made history again by serving as one of the two first black elected officials in Walls, Mississippi, the other being Curtis Farmer.
 
In addition to his duties on the city council, McLemore is a professor of political science at Jackson State University and director of the Fannie Lou Hamer National Institute on Citizenship and Democracy.

References

Mayors of Jackson, Mississippi
African-American mayors in Mississippi
People from Walls, Mississippi
University of Massachusetts Amherst alumni
Living people
1940 births
Rust College alumni
Mississippi Democrats
Mississippi city council members
Clark Atlanta University alumni
21st-century African-American people
20th-century African-American people